Squigglevision is a method of computer animation in which the outlines of shapes are made to wiggle and undulate, emulating the effect of sketchily hand-drawn animation. Tom Snyder of Tom Snyder Productions invented the technique, which his animation studio Soup2Nuts subsequently used in Dr. Katz, Professional Therapist, Dick and Paula Celebrity Special, Home Movies, O'Grady, and Science Court.

Compared with traditional animation, Squigglevision is relatively fast and easy to produce. The non-stop motion of the "squiggling" outlines reduces the need for more complex animations in order to make a scene feel dynamic. Tom Snyder describes the result as "economy of motion". "There are almost no disadvantages," Snyder asserted. "It costs just as much to do a helicopter scene as it does to do a living room scene."

The animators then operate software from Avid Technology to merge the flics into the scene, and synchronize them with the soundtrack.

See also
Animated cartoon
Animation
John Callahan
Richard Condie

References

 
Animation techniques
Audiovisual introductions in 1995
Computer-related introductions in 1995